Bornacoola is an ecclesiastical parish in the Roman Catholic Diocese of Ardagh and Clonmacnoise, Ireland. It is located at the southern extremity of County Leitrim in the civil parish of Mohill. Some of its townlands lie in neighbouring County Longford. The nearest large towns are Longford (8 miles) and Carrick-on-Shannon (11 miles).

Townlands 
The parish is bounded by the townlands indicated below, most of which coincide with the southern parts of the civil parish of Mohill (which straddles two baronies) with a few townlands in a neighbouring civil parish to the west. 
 In the Barony of Mohill, 
Civil parish of Mohill
 Acres, Aghamore, Aghnahunshin, Aghnamona, Ballygeeher (not Bellageeher), Cashel, Cloonboniagh North, Cloonboniagh South, Clooncarreen, Cloonclivvy, Clooncolry, Clooneagh, Cloonmorris, Cloontumpher, Cloonturk, Cornagillagh, Corracramph South, Corrascoffy, Derreen, Drumard (Jones), Drumard (Magerraun), Gortanure South, Gorteenoran or Georgia, Gortnalamph, Gubagraffy, Keelagh, Killinaker, Knockadrinan, Liscloonadea, Meelragh (Nagur), Meelragh (Saggart), Moher, Rinnagowna, Rooskynamona, Tulcon.
 Civil parish of Annaduff
 Aughry, Drumod, Drumod Beg, Drumod More.
 In the Barony of Longford, county of Longford
 Civil parish of Mohill 
 Ahanagh, Bunanass, Clooncolligan, Cloonart North, Cloonart South, Clooneen (Beirne), Clooneen (Cox), Clooneen (Kennedy), Clooneen (Shanly), Edercloon, Tomisky.

Churches
Local churches include St. Michael's Church, Bornacoola and St. Joseph's Church, Cloonturk.

Features

Scoil Mhuire is the local national school (primary school).

Lady Baltimore's Statue is a statue located beside Johnston's Bridge in Bornacoola. It came from Baltimore, Maryland, USA and is named after a place in Bornacoola parish (Baile an Tigh Mor- the town of the big house). The family left Ireland and settled in Maryland and because of this link the statue to Lady Baltimore was sent back to Ireland in the 1970s and erected some years later.

Cloonmorris Ogham stone, also located nearby, is an ancient stone located in the graveyard. It is the only example of an Ogham inscribed stone in County Leitrim. It was incorrectly inverted when placed on a plinth. Also located within the grounds of the graveyard is an early Christian church. This is under the protection of the Office of Public Works.

References

External links
 Bornacoola GAA Club

Towns and villages in County Leitrim
Roman Catholic Diocese of Ardagh and Clonmacnoise